Marrow is the seventh studio album by Norwegian metal band Madder Mortem, released on 21 September 2018 on Dark Essence Records.

Track listing

Personnel 
Madder Mortem
Agnete M. Kirkevaag – vocals
BP M. Kirkevaag – guitars, percussion and vocals
Anders Langberg – guitars
Tormod L. Moseng – bass
Mads Solås – drums, percussion, backing vocals

"Marrow" was composed and recorded with Richard Wikstrand on guitars
Pedal steel guitar on "Until You Return" and "Marrow": Thomas Vik

Production
Produced by BP M. Kirkevaag and Madder Mortem
Engineered by BP M. Kirkevaag
Mixed by BP M. Kirkevaag
Mastering – Peter in de Betou at Tailor Maid
Recorded at Skytterhuset and Studio Omnivore

Reception 
Agnete M. Kirkevaag's dynamic and immensely powerful vocals, are, as always, at the fore on an album that is more doomy than its predecessor, "Red In Tooth And Claw", as well as being at times both heavier, and catchier. "Marrow" is about "sticking to the essence of yourself. Your ideas, your thoughts, your values".

Angrymetalguy.com rates the album 4.5/5.0:

"With their idiosyncratic sound, an avant-garde mixture of alternative, gothic and progressive metal, and frontwoman Agnete Kirkevaag's signature blend of ragged screams and sultry smooth croon, the band is nearing 20 years of existence, yet never gained a large audience. 2016's excellent Red in Tooth and Claw finally started making some waves for the quintet, upon which they now hope to capitalize with Marrow, an album constructed around the central theme of inner strength."

References 

2018 albums
Madder Mortem albums